Options is a 1975 absurdist science fiction novel by American writer Robert Sheckley, published in paperback by Pyramid Books. The first British edition appeared in 1977, and a French translation was published in 1979.

The story is ostensibly about a marooned space traveller's attempt to get a spare part for his starship, the Intrepid III. He has a robotic guard, programmed to guard him against all planetary dangers. But soon he discovers that the robot has not been programmed for the planet where they are, with comic results. However, the narrative later descends into a mass of diversions, non-sequiturs and meditations on the nature of authorship. Eventually the diversions take over the book to the extent that the author openly introduces an increasingly bizarre succession of deus ex machina in an attempt to get the novel back on track, but eventually admits defeat.

Reception
Spider Robinson reviewed the novel favorably, declaring that although Sheckley deliberately broke most of the rules for successful storytelling, Options was "hilarious... an exploding cigarette, a velvet banana, a bearded tractor, a Presbyterian platypus."

Dave Langford reviewed Options for White Dwarf #86, and stated that "the author is 'unable' to construct a credible plot device to save the situation. Lots of fun but, for obvious reasons, not much plot."

References

External links 
 Reviews of most Sheckley's works
 A review

Novels by Robert Sheckley
1975 American novels
1975 science fiction novels
American science fiction novels
Metafictional novels
Postmodern novels
Comic science fiction novels
Pyramid Books books